The following is a list of civil and military operators of the de Havilland Comet since its introduction in 1952.

Civilian

Argentina
Aerolíneas Argentinas ordered six Comet 4s in 1958 and they were delivered in 1959 and 1960, with a service introduction on 16 April 1959, between Buenos Aires and Santiago, Chile. Due to the loss of three aircraft, a replacement Comet 4C was bought in 1962. After being moved from international flights to domestic flights from 1966, the survivors were retired and sold to Dan-Air in 1971.

Australia
Qantas Empire Airways leased seven different Comet 4 aircraft in the early 1960s mainly to operate the Sydney to Singapore route.

Canada
Canadian Pacific Airlines ultimately had none in operation. One Comet 1A aircraft crashed on delivery and another was cancelled.

Federation of Rhodesia and Nyasaland (Central Africa Federation)
Central African Airways operated weekly Salisbury to London services using wet leased BOAC Comets during the early 1960s

East African Community (Kenya, Uganda and Tanzania)
East African Airways acquired three Comet 4s in 1960/62 and operated them on services to Europe for the next decade. They also chartered an additional Comet 4 from BOAC/Dan Air during 1965/66, and an additional three (consecutively) on short-term charters during 1970/71, by which time the Comets were being used for inter-African services.

Ecuador
AREA Ecuador had one Comet 4 delivered in 1966 that was used on services between Quito and Miami. In 1968, the aircraft was impounded at Miami and remained under legal custody until scrapped in 1978.

Egypt
Misrair had two new Comet 4C delivered in 1960. The airline became United Arab Airlines in 1960, which took delivery of seven more Comet 4Cs over the course of the 1960s. Upon the transformation of United Arab Airlines into EgyptAir in 1971, four of these aircraft were inherited by the new airline; they were all sold off over the course of the 1970s.

France

Air France operated three new Comet 1As briefly in the 1950s before they were withdrawn.
Union Aéromaritime de Transport operated three new Comet 1As briefly in the 1950s, one was destroyed and two were withdrawn from service.

Greece
Olympic Airways had four new Comet 4Bs delivered in 1960, operated in a pooling arrangement with BEA.

Indonesia
Merpati Nusantara Airlines had a Comet 2 in 1972.

Kuwait
Kuwait Airways operated one second-hand Comet 4 and two new Comet 4Cs in the 1960s.

Lebanon
Middle East Airlines

Malaysia
Malaysian Airways operated five second-hand Comet 4s in the 1960s. The airline became Malaysia-Singapore Airlines in 1966.

Malaysia (Singapore)
Malaysia-Singapore Airlines inherited five Comet 4s from Malaysian Airlines in 1966 and two more Comet 4s in 1967 and 1968. All sold to Dan-Air London in 1969.

Mexico
Mexicana

Portugal
Transportes Aéreos Portugueses, between 1959 and 1962, chartered a British European Airways Comet 4B to operate a service between London and Lisbon.

Saudi Arabia
The Government of Saudi Arabia ordered a Comet 4C for use of King Saud bin Abdul Aziz. The Comet 4C was delivered in 1962 but crashed in 1963.

South Africa
South African Airways chartered two Comets from BOAC, 1953–1954.

Sudan
Sudan Airways operated two new Comet 4Cs in the 1960s and early 1970s.

United Kingdom
BEA Airtours
British European Airways (BEA)
British Overseas Airways Corporation (BOAC) had a total of 10 Comet 1As delivered in the 1950s, with survivors withdrawn after the Cohen Inquiry findings on early Comet crashes. A total of 19 Comet 4s were delivered from 1957.
Channel Airways obtained five Comet 4Bs from British European Airways in 1970 and these were re-configured to a high-density 109-seat configuration for the inclusive tour charters from the United Kingdom. One aircraft was retired in 1971 as life-expired, the remainder were obtained by Dan-Air when Channel went into receivership in 1972.
Dan-Air, also known as Dan-Air London, bought all of the surviving flyable Comet 4s from the late 1960s into the 1970s; some were for spares reclamation but most were operated on the carrier's inclusive tour charters. A total of 48 Comets of all marks were acquired by the airline.

Military

Canada
Royal Canadian Air Force
 412 Squadron (1953–1963) Comet 1A (later retrofitted to 1XB)

United Kingdom
Royal Air Force
 51 Squadron (1958–1975) Comet C2, 2R
 192 Squadron (1957–1958) Comet C2, 2R
 216 Squadron (1956–1975) Comet C2 and C4
Royal Aircraft Establishment

See also

Hawker Siddeley Nimrod

References

Notes

Bibliography
 Antennas and Propagation, Part 1. London: Institution of Electrical Engineers, 1978. .
 Darling, Kev. De Havilland Comet. North Branch, Minnesota: Specialty Press, 2001. .
 Davies, R.E.G. and Philip J. Birtles. Comet: The World's First Jet Airliner. McLean, Virginia: Paladwr Press, 1999. .
 Jackson, A.J. De Havilland Aircraft since 1909. London: Putnam, Third edition, 1987. .
 Jones, Barry. "Database: D.H. 016 Comet." Aeroplane, Volume 38, No. 4, Issue no. 444, April 2010.
 Roach, J. R. and A. B. Eastwood. Jet Airliner Production List. West Drayton, UK: The Aviation Hobby Shop, 1992, .
 Walker, Timothy. The First  Jet Airliner: The Story of the de Havilland Comet. Newcastle upon Tyne, UK: Scoval Publishing Ltd., 2000. .

De Havilland Comet
Comet